Le Vanneau-Irleau is a commune in the Deux-Sèvres department in western France.

See also
Communes of the Deux-Sèvres department

References

Communes of Deux-Sèvres